The women's 200 metre butterfly event in swimming at the 2013 World Aquatics Championships took place on 31 July and 1 August at the Palau Sant Jordi in Barcelona, Spain.

Records
Prior to this competition, the existing world and championship records were:

Results

Heats
The heats were held at 10:38.

Semifinals
The semifinals were held at 18:55.

Semifinal 1

Semifinal 2

Final
The final was held at 18:46.

References

External links
Barcelona 2013 Swimming Coverage

Butterfly 0200 metre, women's
World Aquatics Championships
2013 in women's swimming